SM UB-98 was a German Type UB III submarine or U-boat in the German Imperial Navy during World War I. She was commissioned into the German Imperial Navy on 8 August 1918 as SM UB-98.

UB-98 was surrendered on 21 November 1918 and broken up in Porthmadog in 1922. Reportedly, the steel plates of the submarine were used to line Garnedd Tunnel on the Ffestiniog Railway, but this has never been proven.

Construction

She was built by AG Vulcan of Hamburg and following just under a year of construction, launched at Hamburg on 1 July 1918. UB-98 was commissioned later the same year under the command of Oblt.z.S. Richard Scheurlen. Like all Type UB III submarines, UB-98 carried 10 torpedoes and was armed with a  deck gun. UB-98 had a displacement of  while surfaced and  when submerged. Her engines enabled her to travel at  when surfaced and  when submerged.

References

Notes

Citations

Bibliography 

 

German Type UB III submarines
World War I submarines of Germany
U-boats commissioned in 1918
1918 ships
Ships built in Hamburg